Pang may refer to:

Places

Siem Pang District, Cambodia
Pangnirtung or Pang, an Inuit hamlet on Baffin Island, Canada
Fo Pang (Chinese: 火棚), an area of Kowloon, Hong Kong
Pang, a hamlet in Leh district, Jammu and Kashmir, India
Pang, Malappuram, a village in Malappuram, Kerala, India
Pang, Parbat, Nepal
Pang, Rolpa, Nepal
Pang Mapha district, Mae Hong Son Province, Thailand
Pang Sila Thong district, Kamphaeng Phet Province, Thailand
River Pang, located in southern England

People

Surname
Pang (surname)
an alternative form of the romanization of Peng (surname) (彭)
Pang brothers (born 1965), Danny and Oxide, filmmakers

Given name
Pang Ding-hong, Chinese name of Chris Patten (born 1944), last Governor of Hong Kong
Pang Juan (龐涓, died 342 BC), military general from the Warring States Period
Pang Tong (龐統, 179–214), strategist and advisor from the late Han Dynasty

Pseudonyms and nicknames
Pang, nickname for Issei Sagawa (born 1949), Japanese man who killed and cannibalized a woman
Korena Pang, pseudonym used by Jeff Mangum (born 1970)
 Madame Pang, nickname for Nualphan Lamsam (born 1966), Thai businesswoman and manager of the Thailand women's national football team

Arts, entertainment and media

Music
Pang (album), a 2019 album by Caroline Polachek
Pangs (band), an American electropunk band
Pangs, a 2017 album by Alasdair Roberts
Swish cymbal, also called a pang cymbal, a percussion instrument

Other uses in arts, entertainment and media
Pang Wanchun, fictional character from Water Margin
 Pang (video game), a video game also known as Buster Bros.
 "Pangs", a TV episode of Buffy the Vampire Slayer

Other uses
Pang uk (Cantonese: 棚屋), shack house
Future French aircraft carrier (PA-NG)

See also

Pennsylvania Air National Guard (PA ANG)